Broseley is a civil parish in Shropshire, England.  It contains 37 listed buildings that are recorded in the National Heritage List for England.  Of these, four are listed at Grade II*, the middle of the three grades, and the others are at Grade II, the lowest grade.  The parish contains the town of Broseley, the village of Jackfield, and the surrounding countryside.  It was in the 18th and early 19th centuries a centre for coal mining, then ironworking, but there are no significant survivors from this.  In the later 19th century a tile making factory was established at Jackfield, and much of it survives as the Jackfield Tile Museum, many of its buildings being listed.  In the town there is a former clay pipe factory which is listed.  Otherwise, most of the listed buildings are houses, and the others include a farmhouse, a former hotel, public houses, a former butcher's shop, a former toll house, a church, and a war memorial.


Key

Buildings

References

Citations

Sources

Lists of buildings and structures in Shropshire